Huba may refer to:

Huba (name)
Huba, Lesser Poland Voivodeship, a village in Poland
Huba language, a language of Nigeria